Don Merrill Beerbower (August 26, 1921 – August 9, 1944) was a United States Army Air Force fighter ace who was credited with shooting down 15.5 aircraft during World War II.

Early life
Beerbower was born on August 26, 1921, to Clarence W. Beerbower and Josephine F. (Carson) Beerbower in Davidson, Saskatchewan. He had two siblings, a sister named Lavaun and a brother named Darrel.

World War II
Beerbower was assigned to 353rd Fighter Squadron of the 354th Fighter Group on January 18, 1943, at Hamilton Field, California. In March 1943, Beerbower was promoted to 1st Lieutenant.
 
On October 21, 1943, Beerbower left with his unit for England. They were initially stationed at RAF Greenham Common in November 1943, before moving to RAF Boxted where they flew their missions from. They flew the North American P-51B Mustangs. Beerbower flew his first combat mission on December 1, 1943, and scored his first victory, a Messerschmitt Bf 109 on January 5, 1944. Beerbower named his P-51B 'Bonnie B', in honor of his daughter, Bonnie.
 
Beerbower began scoring additional victories in January 1944 and was promoted to Captain on January 15, 1944. He finally achieved the flying ace status on February 20, 1944, by shooting down a Bf 109, his fifth victory. On April 8, 1944, Beerbower destroyed three German planes and damaged two others out of a numerically superior force which attacked the bomber formation he was escorting.
 
The 354th FG moved to RAF Lashenden on April 17, 1944. Following the Invasion of Normandy in June 1944, the unit moved to Cricqueville Airfield, an Advanced Landing Ground in the Normandy region of northern France. Beerbower became a double ace on August 8, 1944, by scoring his tenth victory. He was awarded the Silver Star by Lewis H. Brereton, the commanding officer of the Ninth Air Force in ceremonies in France. Though fellow pilots were transitioning to the newer P-51D, Beerbower chose to retain his B-model as it had 4 50 cal machine guns and was lighter as a result, with better speed, climb and maneuver characteristics.
 
Beerbower scored his final victory, a Focke-Wulf Fw 190 on July 7, 1944, bringing his total aerial victories to 15 and 2 aircraft destroyed on ground.

Death
Beerbower destroyed one enemy plane, gun emplacement and aimed for a second. On their second pass, his plane took hits in the wing and fuselage, then went into a straight vertical climb, stalled and dove straight down into the ground. Beerbower jettisoned the canopy during these maneuvers and managed to get out of the aircraft, only to hit the tail. He never opened his chute. The plane crashed and he was killed. He was posthumously awarded the Distinguished Service Cross for his final mission and the Silver Star for his April 8 mission.
 
Beerbower was initially buried in Temporary American Military Cemetery in Champigneul, France, before being buried at Epinal American Cemetery.

Legacy
A memorial plate/marker in English and French honoring Beerbower was placed near the entrance to the village's 12th-century church, Mont d’Hor in Saint-Thierry, France in 2014. He was also inducted to the Minnesota Aviation Hall of Fame in 2000.

Awards and decorations
Beerbower's decorations include:

Distinguished Service Cross citation

See also
RAF Boxted
Kenneth H. Dahlberg
Wah Kau Kong
Glenn T. Eagleston
Jack T. Bradley

References

External links

1921 births
1944 deaths
American World War II flying aces
Aviators from Iowa
Aviators from Minnesota
Canadian World War II flying aces
Recipients of the Distinguished Service Cross (United States)
Recipients of the Silver Star
Recipients of the Distinguished Flying Cross (United States)
United States Army Air Forces pilots of World War II
United States Army Air Forces personnel killed in World War II
Aviators killed by being shot down
Aviators killed in aviation accidents or incidents in France
Recipients of the Air Medal
Recipients of the Distinguished Flying Cross (United Kingdom)
Recipients of the Croix de Guerre 1939–1945 (France)